Gianluca (John) Attanasio  is a British-Italian singer-songwriter, composer, record producer, screenwriter, film director, photographer and journalist.

Specializing in modern piano and composition at "Laboratorio musicale Walter Savelli" in Florence, Attanasio released several CD albums from 1989. These albums were published by several labels, including Italian "Aliante/Time music" label (Sergio Cammariere), Warner/Chappell Music and EMI music. During the following years he wrote music for dance television and short films, starting international collaborations with Mike Applebaum (Zucchero), Geoff Westley (Lucio Battisti, Riccardo Cocciante, Bee Gees), Renato Serio (Renato Zero), Susanne Hahn, Roberto Guarino (Samuele Bersani, Loredana Bertè), Kathleen Hagen (Mario Biondi), and Walter Savelli (Claudio Baglioni). In theatre he worked with international stage writers, poets and directors including Peter Colley, Ennio Coltorti, Francesco Giuffrè, Daniele Scattina, Carlo Giuffrè, Gianluca Ramazzotti, Beppe Costa. In 1998, with other Italian musicians, he opened Claudio Baglioni's concert in Olimpic Stadium of Rome. In 2005 Attanasio created and carried on a musical project "Harmonia" with Aldo and Roberto Gemma brothers and French actress Martin Brochard as a singer.

In 2007 Gianluca won the "Fondi La Pastora" theatre -Award (XXXIIIth edition) received in Rome. Best music for "AK-47", piece by Daniele Scattina and Claudio De Santis. "Last song" is his first short drama film, written by him and Katheen Hagen. He produced the CD Soul of the ocean with 24 soundtracks and My first secret, a solo piano CD containing "Serenata dal cuore", a song composed for Pope John Paul II's birthday, and performed in front of the Pope in the Sala Nervi (Vatican City). This pièce was played by the Alessandria Classical Orchestra conducted by Mr. Renato Serio. In 2012, Attanasio was invited at the Italian Cultural Institute by UCMF ( Union des Compositeurs de Musique de Film) of Paris  to give a masterclass on the relationship between music and images in the films, dance and theater. He worked for Italian National tabloids and international magazines including "Il Tempo", "Il Giornale", "Rocktar", "Metal Shock", "Private Photo Review", specializing in music and teatre criticism.

Discography 
1994: In fondo al blu (Warner/Chappell)
1997: In questo universo (Aliante/Time music)
1998: Balla con me (Aliante/Time music)
2005: La vie continue. Martine Brochard as singer
1999: Stasera sono spento (Aliante/Time music)
2007 Soul of the ocean (Soundtracks) 
2007: My first secret (piano solo album) 
2010: "Sorry" (Rossodisera/EMI MUSIC) produced by Raffaele Festa Campanile Carmen Serra as singer 
2010: "Scusa" (Italian version, Rossodisera/ EMI MUSIC) produced by Raffaele Festa Campanile Carmen Serra as Singer
2010  "Colors of life", single
2010  "Automne", single
2010  "Time's memory"
2010  "Last song. Sofia's promise"
2012  "One day I'll be happy"
2014  "La lista di Schindler" (Original Theatre Score), album 
2018  "Go fuck yourself" (single)
2018  "Snow covered your scars" (single)
2018  "Sky in the night" (album)
2018  "Gianluca Attanasio Demos & Rarities" (album)
2018  "Gianluca Attanasio Unplugged 2006. Italian Edition"(album)
2019  "Rays of heart", single
2019  "Beautiful Darkness", album
2019  "Haunted Loves", album
2019  "Pyramidal Crisis, Death of The Virgin", album
2019  "Chasing The Ghost Planet", album  
2019  "Emotional Reset – Slow Down Beat", single
2019  "Emotional Reset – Flying in the Sky", single
2020  "Beyond2Doors" - Album

Theatre and film director 
2003: "Posteggio o non posteggio, per i soldi è un gran magheggio". Teatro petrolini in Rome 
2007: "La casa di nuvole, luoghi immaginari ma possibili. Forse una favola". Attanasio as composer, actor and pianist. 
2010: "Last song: Sofia's promise" with Goffredo Maria Bruno , Riccardo Mei , Glenda Canino.
2011: "Anche i cani hanno un'anima" video-interview with Franca Valeri
2011: "One day I'll be happy". Short movie
2012: "No regrets". Short movie 
2012: "Rovine" Short movie 
2012: "Le parfum de la vie" . Short movie with Mauro Mascitti and Pino Piggianelli

Music for Theatre 
2003: Romeo and Juliet by Daniele Scattina
2006: AK-47 by Daniele Scattina 
2009: La neve era sporca, directed by Daniele Scattina
2009: Napoleone e... il generale by Soisiz Moreau, directed by Gianluca Ramazzotti and Mauro Mandolini
2009: 2012– L’attesa by Goffredo Maria Bruno
2009: "2.24"  by Pascual Carbonell & Jerónimo Cornelles
2009: "Un’ora senza televisione" written by Jame Salom and directed by Gianluca Ramazzotti. With Patrizia Pellegrino and Ennio Coltorti
2009: "Un lungo applauso", written and directed by Mauro Mandolini 
2010: Crime and Punishment written by Fyodor Dostoyevsky and directed by Francesco Giuffrè
2011: Crime and Punishment written by Fyodor Dostoyevsky and directed by Francesco Giuffrè
2011: "Ritratto di Sartre da giovane". Music adaptation 
2011: "Tornerò prima di mezzanotte", written by Peter Colley. Directed by Gianluca Ramazzotti, with Gianluca Ramazzotti, Miriam Mesturino, Roberto Mantovani, Daniela Scarlatti. Teatro Erba, Turin. 
2011: "2.24"  written by Pascual Carbonell & Jerónimo Cornelles. Directed by Gianluca Ramazzotti, with Mauro Mandolini, Veruska Rossi, Elisa d'Eusanio. Teatro dell'Orologio, Rome.
2014: "LA lista di Schindler", with Carlo Giuffrè. Teatro Eliseo in Rome 
2018: "A message from Mars". Live soundtrack, Teatro in Scatola, Rome

Music for Dance 
2003: "Romeo e Giulietta". Choreography by Andrea Cagnetti. Teatro Vascello and Teatro Greco in Rome.
2004: "Serenate from the heart". Choreography by Andrea Cagnetti. Vatican City 
2004: "Il walzer della vita". Choreography by Andrea Cagnetti (Rome)
2004: "Paisaje interno". Choreography by Paula Rosolen. Teatro Greco in Rome
2004: "Skean Deep". Choreography by Andrea Cagnetti. Teatro Don Luigi Orione in Rome
2004: "Merry Christmas Peter Pan". Choreography by Arsmovendi. Gran Teatro in Rome
2006: "Colora una vita". Choreography by Arsmevendi. Teatro Greco in Rome 
2012: Earth. Choreography by Andrea Cagnetti, Fran Spector Atkins
2012: Night of the toys, Choreography by Spectordance . Monterey, California

Film music 
2010 "Last song: Sofia's promise"  
2010 "Drake diamond", produced and directed by Clyde Lucas  ( pre-production)
2011 "One day I'll be happy"   
2012 "Something to remember", directed by Ken Gregg 
2012 "Rovine" 
2012 "No regrets" 
2019 "Lefferts Cross", directed by Ed "Bo" Davis

Television spot 
 2011 "Cantina Todini", MEDIASET NETWORK with the actress Patrizia Pellegrino
 2019 "Third edition of Castelli Romani Film Festival"

External links 
  Official site
 
 Official portfolio on Flickr 
 On National Geographic 
 On Private Photo Review Magazine

References 
  review on "La lista di Schindler"
  Interview on Tgcom
  Interview on Musicalnews
  review
  Napoleon Museum
  reviews on "IL TEMPO" Tabloid
  Cineteca nazionale di Bologna 
  Interview 
  Review
  article on "L’Union des Compositeurs de Musiques de Films" (U.C.M.F.)
  Interview on Starlightmusicchronicles.
  Guercino Rock Festival
  Album review
  Album review

Living people
1979 births
Musicians from Rome
Italian male pianists
21st-century pianists
21st-century Italian male musicians